The 4 × 10 kilometre relay cross-country skiing at the 1976 Winter Olympics in Innsbruck, Austria was held on Thursday 12 February at Seefeld. It was the ninth appearance of the 4 × 10 km relay in the Winter Olympics.

It was the fourth time that Finland won the gold medal in the event. Norway finished second in the relay, the Soviet Union won bronze.

Results
Sources:

References

External links
Results International Ski Federation (FIS)

Men's cross-country skiing at the 1976 Winter Olympics
Men's 4 × 10 kilometre relay cross-country skiing at the Winter Olympics